Max Naumann (12 January 1875 – 18 May 1939) was the founder of Verband nationaldeutscher Juden (League of National German Jews), which called for the elimination of Jewish ethnic identity through Jewish assimilation. The league was outlawed by the Nazis on 18 November 1935.

Naumann was a captain in the Bavarian Army during World War I and a Berlin lawyer.

Early life
Naumann was born to an assimilated Eastern European Jewish family. He attended the Friedrichs-Werdersches Gymnasium in Berlin, and received a law degree from the University of Berlin. He served as an infantry commander during World War I and was awarded the Iron Cross (First and Second Class).

Political action
Standing in opposition to Zionist groups and Jewish organizations such as the Centralverein deutscher Staatsbürger jüdischen Glaubens (Central Association of German Citizens of Jewish Faith), Naumann advocated total assimilation as an answer to antisemitism. During the Weimar Republic Naumann was active with the German People's Party. He was quoted in Michael Brenner's book The Renaissance of Jewish Culture in Weimar Germany as saying "The election campaign must not be a struggle of religious conceptions, it must be a decisive struggle about our Germanness!" in reference to the 1933 election that followed Hitler's rise to power.

Along with Julius Brodnitz, Heinrich Stahl, Kurt Blumenfeld and Martin Rosenblüth, Naumann was one of the Jewish activists who were summoned to a meeting with Hermann Göring on 25 March 1933. Göring tried to enlist their help in preventing a rally against Nazi antisemitism which was planned in New York City for 27 March (see Mass meetings of the Anti-Nazi boycott of 1933). Göring claimed that Jews in Germany were spreading lies about Jews being attacked by Nazi forces. Naumann responded to Göring by producing a list of abuses, even producing a newspaper clipping showing Nazis forcing Jews to scrub streets with brushes. Naumann was among the Jewish leaders who said there was nothing that they could do to stop the protest in foreign countries.

Naumann's group was dissolved by the Gestapo in 1935. Naumann was incarcerated at Columbia Haus and released after a few weeks. He died of cancer on 18 May 1939.

References

External links
Entry on Naumann at the Simon Wiesenthal Center website

1875 births
1939 deaths
Deaths from cancer in Germany
Date of death missing
Politicians from Berlin
German Jewish military personnel of World War I
20th-century German lawyers
German People's Party politicians
Humboldt University of Berlin alumni
Military personnel of Bavaria
Recipients of the Iron Cross (1914), 1st class
German anti-Zionists
Jewish anti-Zionism in Germany
Anti-Zionist Jews
Jewish collaborators with Nazi Germany